Terrence Johnson is an American college basketball coach who is the current head coach of the Texas State Bobcats men's basketball team.

Coaching career
The son of a basketball coach, Johnson began coaching at the high school level, including at St. Bernard High School in Louisiana and Alief Elsik High School in the Houston area, while also working as a personal trainer and AAU coach for many future college basketball players. In 2010, he'd be hired by Jimmy Tillette as an assistant coach at Samford where he'd stay until 2012 before returning to the Houston area and the AAU ranks. Johnson would make his return to college coach when he joined Danny Kaspar's staff at Texas State in 2015 as an assistant coach. In 2020 when Kaspar resigned after being accused of making racially insensitive remarks, Johnson was promoted to the head coaching position on an interim basis.

After guiding the Bobcats to an 18–7 and a Sun Belt regular season title and earning conference Coach of the Year honors, Johnson was named the permanent head coach on March 11, 2021.

Head coaching record

References

Year of birth missing (living people)
Living people
American men's basketball coaches
Basketball coaches from Louisiana
College men's basketball head coaches in the United States
Prairie View A&M University alumni
Samford Bulldogs men's basketball coaches
Southern University alumni
Sportspeople from New Orleans
Texas State Bobcats men's basketball coaches